Schwenker is a local term from the German state of Saarland,  the Mosel Valley and big parts of Rheinland Pfalz and is used in three ways, all relating to the same grilled meat:

 Schwenker or Schwenkbraten is a marinated pork neck steak which originates from the Saarland (known there as Schwenksteak) and is grilled on a Schwenker (2).  Normally either a green herb or red paprika marinade is used when preparing Schwenkbraten.  Traditionally, Schwenkbraten is made of pork, but turkey variants have also become popular recently.  Schwenkbraten are about the size of a hand in length and width and are about 1 cm to 3 cm thick.
 A Schwenker is a grill on which the Schwenker steak typically is grilled.  The Schwenker consists of a fire bowl (or just the camp fire) and a swinging grill hung from a tripod or in fewer cases from a gallows-like structure. Schwenkers are sometimes created from various handy materials in an impromptu fashion, but “Schwenk-Grills” can be purchased in local supermarkets, and in DIY stores. 
 A person who operates the Schwenker grill is also called Schwenker or less frequently, Schwenkermeister. 

Grilling is done over an open beech wood fire. Charcoal is sometimes used, but that is regarded as sub-standard because the beech smoke is considered to be an important part of the process. Gas-fueled grills are never used (except in commercial snack bars).

Beside the Schwenker, sausages (German bratwurst and French merguez), different vegetables (such as bell peppers), Brötchen (German bread rolls, in Saarland preferably Doppelweck, see German cuisine), baguette (French type of bread) with garlic butter, potatoes and feta cheese (the latter three protected in aluminium foil) may be grilled.

Various side salads (usually a pasta (typically fusilli or spiralini) salad, a potato salad and a green salad), and baguette or Flutes are served with Schwenker.  Many prefer specific beers, such as a pils by one of the local breweries, with their Schwenker.

Brief history

Legend has it that this style of cooking came to the region from South America, specifically the Rio Grande do Sul region of Brazil, where it is said that German immigrants took it back home to their region of origin, the Hunsrück area, and Idar-Oberstein in particular.  The region's Agate cutters had to travel further afield for their supplies as the local deposits became worked out in the early 19th Century and it is said that they enjoyed the Churrascaria they found in Brazil.  The main similarity is that large chunks of meat are cooked over an open fire and served with vegetables.

In Saarland it is believed that the techqniue became more popular due to the local steel industry, which allowed the workers to construct their "Schwenker" grills easily on their own, from metal parts discarded in steel production. Even today, although steel production in Saarland plays a smaller role than before, it is considered somewhat inappropriate to buy a "Schwenker" in a shop, but rather construct it oneself, preferably from high quality steel varieties, such as V2A steel.

The process of grilling the Schwenker is known as “Schwenken”, which not only describes the grilling process itself but also the social event which surrounds the grilling activity.  In Saarland one would not be invited to a barbecue, but would instead be invited “Schwenken”.

Today "Schwenken" is also becoming popular in neighboring Luxembourg, as evidenced by the fact that a Luxembourgian team scored 1st in the discipline of "Schwenken" in a European barbecue competition in Saarland in 2019

Related dishes
In the nearby Hunsrück district of Rhineland-Palatinate, the local speciality Spießbraten is often served along with or instead of Schwenker. Raw meat, most usually pork neck or loin but sometimes also beef is marinated in a mixture of onions, salt and pepper for several hours. The steaks are usually cut to about 3 cm and thus somewhat thicker then the usual pork neck Schwenker. The meat is then roasted over an open beech log fire and served with potatoes and grated radish or seasoned cabbage.  This is carried out in a similar manner to Schwenker, on a large grill resembling a wheel hanging down above the fire.  The wheel is rotated slowly over the fire to ensure even cooking.

A dish beyond borders
Swinging grills and the aforementioned cuts are gaining popularity. If it's true that the Germans brought it from Brazil, it's also true that Americans brought it back to the U.S. 

It is popular at beer festivals and other outdoor events and is also served in local restaurants, frequently accompanied with bratkartoffeln (sliced fried potatoes), onions and sweet cucumber.

For many years the town of Idar-Oberstein hosted an annual Spießbraten Festival.

References

External links

Pork dishes
Barbecue
German cuisine
Rhenish cuisine
Cooking techniques
Hunsrück